Ambika Vihar may refer to:

Ambika Vihar, Delhi
Ambika Vihar, Kolkata